Shake Sugaree - Taj Mahal Sings and Plays for Children is a 1988 album by American blues artist Taj Mahal. The title comes from one of the tracks, and was itself the title track of a 1967 album by Elizabeth Cotten, recorded in February 1965. Authorship of the song is attributed to Cotten.

Track listing
 "Fishin' Blues"
 "Brown Girl in the Ring"
 "Light Rain"
 "Quavi, Quavi"
 "Shake Sugaree" (Elizabeth Cotten)
 "Funky Bluesy ABC's"
 "Talkin' John Henry"
 "Railroad Bill"
 "A Soulful Tune"
 "Little Brown Dog"

Personnel
Taj Mahal - vocals, guitar, mandolin, harmonica
Ahmen Mahal, Deva Mahal - backing vocals

References

1988 albums
Taj Mahal (musician) albums